Hartmut Bärnighausen (born 16 February 1933 in Chemnitz) is a German chemist and crystallographer. He is known for establishing the Bärnighausen trees which describe group-subgroup relationships of crystal structures.

Life 
Bärnighausen studied Chemistry at Leipzig University and received his diploma after a diploma thesis with Leopold Wolf in 1955. In May 1958, he flew from East Germany to University of Freiburg, where he worked with Georg Brauer. He finished his doctorate in the group of Georg Brauer in 1959. In 1967, he received his habilitation. From 1967 to 1998, he was a professor for inorganic chemistry at the University of Karlsruhe.

Research 
His research focused on the following topics:

 crystallographic group theory in crystal chemistry (Bärnighausen trees)
 synthesis and characterization of new compounds in including rare earth metals
 structure refinements of twinned crystals

Awards 
He was awarded the Carl Hermann Medal of the German Crystallographic Society in 1997.

References

Living people
20th-century German chemists
Crystallographers
1933 births
People from Chemnitz
Academic staff of the Karlsruhe Institute of Technology
Leipzig University alumni
University of Freiburg alumni
Inorganic chemists